"Tranz" is a 2018 song by British virtual band Gorillaz.

Tranz may also refer to:

 Tranz Metro, a former New Zealand public transport operator
 Tranz Rail, the main rail operator in New Zealand from 1991 to 2003

See also
 Tranz Am, a 1983 action video game
 Trance (disambiguation)
 Trans (disambiguation)